Cala En Porter (often referred to as Cala'n Porter or Calan Porter) is a village in the Alaior municipality of Menorca.  It is located on the island's south coast.

It was one of the earliest developed beach resorts on the island. Cala En Porter has a beach cove similar to that of Lulworth Cove, England, UK, with high imposing limestone cliffs. Whilst the western cliff remains totally undeveloped, the eastern side is now covered in villas and terrace bars.  The resort is home to a number of restaurants and bars, as well as the nightclub Cova de en Xoroi (commonly called The Caves).

References

Geography of Menorca